Christian Unity Movement (Spanish: Movimiento de Unidad Cristiana - MUC),  was founded by dissidents from the Nicaraguan Party of the Christian Path (CCN) in year 2000. As of 2006, MUC is part of the Sandinista National Liberation Front alliance.

See also
Nicaraguan Revolution
Sandinista National Liberation Front

References

Evangelicalism in Nicaragua
2000 establishments in Nicaragua
Protestant political parties
Political parties established in 2000
Conservative parties in Nicaragua
Sandinista National Liberation Front